The 1998 San Diego Padres season was the 30th season in franchise history. The Padres won the National League championship and advanced to the World Series for the second time in franchise history.

San Diego featured five All-Stars: pitchers Andy Ashby, Kevin Brown, and Trevor Hoffman, and outfielders Tony Gwynn and Greg Vaughn. Brown and Hoffman were two of the premier pitchers in baseball for 1998. Brown led the staff in wins, earned run average, and strikeouts, and he also finished in the league's top five in each category. Hoffman saved 53 games and was voted the NL Rolaids Relief Man Award for best closer in the league. Ashby was the team's number two starter with 17 wins.

The Padres offense was led by Vaughn, who had the greatest season of his career in 1998. He ended up winning both the Comeback Player of the Year Award and the Silver Slugger Award. And in a season headlined by sluggers Mark McGwire and Sammy Sosa, Vaughn was matching them in home runs before finishing with 50 (compared to 70 for McGwire and 66 for Sosa). Former MVP Ken Caminiti was second on the team in home runs and runs batted in. Gwynn had a .321 batting average.

In the regular season, San Diego won the NL Western Division. Their 98–64 record was third-best in the league, behind only the Atlanta Braves and Houston Astros, who San Diego then went a combined 7–3 against in winning the NL pennant. But the Padres faced the 1998 New York Yankees in the World Series, and were swept, four games to none.

Offseason
November 26, 1997: Jorge Velandia was traded by the San Diego Padres with Doug Bochtler to the Oakland Athletics for David Newhan and Don Wengert.
December 15, 1997: Derrek Lee was traded by the San Diego Padres with Steve Hoff (minors) and Rafael Medina to the Florida Marlins for Kevin Brown.

Regular season

Opening Day starters

Season standings

Record vs. opponents

Notable transactions
April 8, 1998: Buddy Carlyle was traded by the Cincinnati Reds to the San Diego Padres for Marc Kroon.
June 20, 1998: Jim Leyritz was traded by the Boston Red Sox with Ethan Faggett (minors) to the San Diego Padres for Carlos Reyes, Mandy Romero, and Darío Veras.
August 6, 1998: Randy Myers was traded by the Toronto Blue Jays to the San Diego Padres for Brian Loyd (minors).
August 31, 1998: John Vander Wal was traded by the Colorado Rockies to the San Diego Padres for a player to be named later. The San Diego Padres sent Kevin Burford (minors) (October 29, 1998) to the Colorado Rockies to complete the trade.

Roster

Player stats

Batting

Starters by position
Note: Pos = Position; G = Games played; AB = At bats; H = Hits; Avg. = Batting average; HR = Home runs; RBI = Runs batted in

Other batters
Note: G = Games played; AB = At bats; H = Hits; Avg. = Batting average; HR = Home runs; RBI = Runs batted in

Pitching

Starting pitchers
Note: G = Games pitched; IP = Innings pitched; W = Wins; L = Losses; ERA = Earned run average; SO = Strikeouts

Other pitchers
Note: G = Games pitched; IP = Innings pitched; W = Wins; L = Losses; ERA = Earned run average; SO = Strikeouts

Relief pitchers
Note: G = Games pitched; W = Wins; L = Losses; SV = Saves; ERA = Earned run average; SO = Strikeouts

League honors

All-Stars
 Andy Ashby
 Kevin Brown
 Tony Gwynn, starter
 Trevor Hoffman
 Greg Vaughn

Awards
 Rolaids Relief Award: Trevor Hoffman
 Comeback Player of the Year Award: Greg Vaughn
 Silver Slugger Award: Greg Vaughn (OF)

Statistical leaders
Kevin Brown
 #2 ERA (2.38)
 #2 Strikeouts (257)
 #2 WHIP (1.07)
 #2 Innings Pitched (257)
 #4 Wins (18)
 #4 Complete Games (7)

Tony Gwynn
 #1 At-Bats Per Strikeout (25.6)

Trevor Hoffman
 #1 Saves (53)

Greg Vaughn
 #3 Home runs (50)
 #5 Slugging percentage (.597)
 #5 Total Bases (342)

National League Division Series

Houston Astros vs. San Diego Padres
San Diego wins the series, 3-1

National League Championship Series

World Series

Game 1
October 17, 1998, at Yankee Stadium in New York City

In Game 1, Kevin Brown took the hill for the Padres and he was opposed by Yankee ace and ALCS MVP David Wells.  The Yankees began the scoring in the 2nd inning, when rookie Ricky Ledée laced a 2-run double into the right field corner with the bases loaded.  Wells was battered hard for the only time in the postseason beginning with the 3rd when Greg Vaughn homered to right-center with a man aboard tying the game up at 2 runs apiece.  In the 5th, Tony Gwynn smashed a 2-run shot off the facing of the upper deck and that was followed up immediately by Vaughn's second dinger of the night.  Trailing 5–2, the Yanks made their comeback in the 7th. Jorge Posada singled and Ledee walked ending the night for Brown.  It turned out to be a bad move by Padres manager Bruce Bochy.  New York took advantage of the Padres bullpen with a 3-run homer by Chuck Knoblauch that tied the game at 5. Later in the inning, a 2-2 count call by home plate umpire Rich Garcia was decisive. Mark Langston's pitch was shown on television replays to be a strike, which Rich Garcia called a ball. Tino Martinez took advantage of Garcia's call and on the next pitch sent a grand slam into the upper deck making it a 9–5 lead. The Padres score only one more run as the Yankees won game one, 9–6.

Game 2
October 18, 1998, at Yankee Stadium in New York City

In Game 2, the Bombers took a big early lead, thanks to a dreadful outing by San Diego starter Andy Ashby.  Bernie Williams and Jorge Posada hit home runs to assist the Yankees on offense.  New York started Cuban import, Orlando Hernández, who was outstanding.

Game 3
October 20, 1998, at Qualcomm Stadium in San Diego, California

With the Yankees up 2–0, they sent David Cone to the mound to face former Yankee pitcher, Sterling Hitchcock, the MVP of the NLCS.  Both teams were kept off the scoreboard until the bottom of the 6th when Hitchcock himself led off the inning with a single off Cone.  He and Qulivio Veras both scored two batters later when Tony Gwynn shot a double down the line past Tino Martinez at first base.  Gwynn also scored in the inning to give San Diego a 3–0 lead.  However, a half inning later the Yanks jumped on Hitchcock for two runs beginning with a home run to left-center by Scott Brosius.  The second run came in after Shane Spencer doubled and scored on an error by Ken Caminiti.  In the 8th, the call was made to Trevor Hoffman after Randy Myers walked Paul O'Neill to open the inning.  Hoffman then walked Tino Martinez before Scott Brosius tagged a three-run blast over the fence in dead center.  With a 5–3 lead, the Yankees wrapped up the victory when Mariano Rivera picked up the save in the 9th to end it.

Game 4
October 21, 1998, at Qualcomm Stadium in San Diego, California

New York's Andy Pettitte outpitched San Diego's Kevin Brown with 7 strong innings for the 3-0 Yankees victory, giving the Bombers their 24th title.  Though New York's reliever Jeff Nelson allowed the Padres to load the bases, Mariano Rivera came in to end the threat by getting Jim Leyritz, known for his clutch postseason homers with San Diego, to fly out.  Rivera added another scoreless inning for the save.

Farm system

References

External links
 1998 San Diego Padres at Baseball Reference
 1998 San Diego Padres at Baseball Almanac

San Diego Padres seasons
San Diego Padres season
National League West champion seasons
National League champion seasons
San Diego Padres